The Mooskappe is an old, traditional miners head covering. It was intended to protect miners when working underground from the impact of small rockfalls and from hitting their heads against the gallery roof (Firste). The term is German and this type of hat was worn especially in the Harz Mountains of Germany.

It is known that the Mooskappe was definitely used in the Harz and Barsinghausen mining regions. It appears in steel engravings from about 1850, for example by  Wilhelm Ripe, as an important item of safety gear. In 1824 Heinrich Heine visited the Caroline and Dorothea mines at Clausthal. He wrote about these visits in various places including in his work Die Harzreise where he says:

The Mooskappe was usually made of a hard, green felt, but there were also "crocheted" (gehäkelte) designs. The shape is either clearly cylindrical but it can also be dome-shaped.

See also 
Miner's cap
Miner's habit

Sources 
 Wilfried Liessmann: Historischer Bergbau im Harz. Springer-Verlag, Berlin, 2nd edition, 1997
 Stadt Barsinghausen (Hrsg.): Barsinghausen: Unter Klöppel, Schlegel und Eisen. Phillip Aug. Weinaug Verlag u. Druckerei GmbH, 1st edition, 1994
 Horst Krenzel: Erinnerungen an den Steinkohle-Bergbau im Deistergebirge. Geiger- Verlag, Horb am Neckar, 3rd edition, 1999
 Margret Rettich: Das Buch vom Bergwerk, Verlag Friedrich Oetinger, Hamburg, 1st edition, 1999
 Wolfgang Borges: Gesichter im Grubenlicht, Verlag August Lax, Hildesheim, 1st edition, 1982

Caps
History of mining in Germany
Miners' clothing